The 1937–38 Campeonato da Liga was the fourth season of top-tier football in Portugal. Although the first national competition (in a knock-out cup format) was still called Portuguese Championship, the Primeira Liga winners are considered the national champions.

Overview
It was contested by 8 teams, and S.L. Benfica won the championship.

League standings

Results

References

Primeira Liga seasons
1937–38 in Portuguese football
Portugal